The 2015–16 season was Wycombe Wanderers' 129th season in existence and their 23rd consecutive season in the Football League.

League data

League table

Results summary

Results by round

Scores overview
Wycombe Wanderers' score given first.

Match details

Legend

Friendlies

League Two

The fixtures for the 2015–16 season were announced on 17 June 2015.

FA Cup

League Cup

Football League Trophy

Wycombe received a bye for the first round so entered the tournament in the second round.

Team details

Squad information

 Loan player

Appearances and goals

|-
|colspan="14"|Players who left the club before the end of the season:

|}

Transfers

Transfers in

Transfers out

Loans in

Loans out

References

Wycombe Wanderers
Wycombe Wanderers F.C. seasons